The World Series of Pop Culture is a VH1 game show tournament program. The second season was taped in New York City from March 22–23, 2007 at the Grand Ballroom at Manhattan Center. The top prize was $250,000 provided by Alltel Wireless. The tournament began airing on July 9, 2007, with a "soft", unadvertised premiere July 8. VH1 made the premiere episode available via the On Demand service of many cable systems starting July 2, 2007. Pat Kiernan returned to host the second season. Post-game interviews were handled by Erin Davidson, Katherine Gotsick, and Amber Tillett from season 1 team Cheetara.

The tournament was won by NYU students Victor Lee, Andrew Unterberger, and Andrew Weber, collectively known as the Twistëd Misters. They split the $250,000 cash prize, and won an entry for a possible 2008 tournament, although the show has since been discontinued. Victor Lee, however, would go on to compete on GSN's Grand Slam, which aired just weeks after the World Series finale in the summer of 2007, where he would lose in the first round of the tournament.

Tournament Bracket

Teams
Twistëd Misters (Victor Lee, Andrew Unterberger, Andrew Weber) (winners)
Wocka Wocka (Kelly Bishop, Robert Bishop, Rachel Cahill) (runners-up)
El Chupacabra (Alexandra Clark Burris, Jodi Roth, Mason Spencer) (defending champions)
3 Men and a Little Lazy (Gary Kalina, Steve Kalina, Matt Schuman)
Almost Perfect Strangers 2.0 (Lucien Eldred, Tod Gallion, Kyle Webb)
Carlton Banks Dance Academy (Smitha Chadaga, Joe Munsayac, Kryss Peterson)
Fat Guys in Little Coats (Peter Kim, Keevan Lee, Josh Miller)
Fragilay (Shalonda Harper, Sherita Harrison, Tomie Heirs-Johnson)
Jammin' on the 1 (Durwood Murray, Aimée Meredith, Anthony Donovan)
The Lucky Stars (Brad Hudgins, Nikki Hudgins, John Taylor)
Remo-Leen-Teen-Teen (Rich McPherson, Warren McPherson, Margottina Verch)
Team Motherboy (Jamie Mauldin, Holly McCord, Lizzie Tompkins)
They're Real and They're Spectacular (Michelle Boley, Melissa DePaul, Danielle Ribalta)
Truffle Shuffles (Farrell Kellener, Dominick Muzio, J.P. Muzio)
Westerburg High (Eric Melin, Andy Morton, J.D. Warnock)
The White Russians (Chris Miller, Lori Miller, Stewart Pawley)
More Cowbell (Derek Cormier, Dan Lincoln, Jason Smith)

External links 
 Official season 2 site

2007 American television seasons